USNS Relentless (T-AGOS-18) was a Stalwart-class modified tactical auxiliary general ocean surveillance ship in service in the United States Navy from 1990 to 1993. Since 1998, she has been in commission in the National Oceanic and Atmospheric Administration (NOAA) fleet as the fisheries research ship NOAAS Gordon Gunter (R 336).

Construction

The U.S. Navy ordered Relentless from VT Halter Marine, on 20 February 1987. VT Halter Marine laid her down at Moss Point, Mississippi, on 22 April 1988, launched her on 12 May 1989, and delivered her to the U.S. Navy on 12 January 1990.

United States Navy service
On the day of her delivery, the U.S. Navy placed the ship in non-commissioned service in the Military Sealift Command as USNS Relentless (T-AGOS-18). Like the other Stalwart-class ships, she was designed to collect underwater acoustical data in support of Cold War anti-submarine warfare operations against Soviet Navy submarines using Surveillance Towed Array Sensor System (SURTASS) sonar equipment. She operated with a mixed crew of U.S. Navy personnel and civilian merchant mariners.

After the Cold War ended with the collapse of the Soviet Union in late December 1991, the requirement for SURTASS collection declined. The Navy took Relentless out of service on 17 March 1993 and transferred her to the National Oceanic and Atmospheric Administration (NOAA) the same day. She was stricken from the Naval Vessel Register on 20 May 1993.

National Oceanic and Atmospheric Administration service

NOAA converted the ship into a fisheries research ship and commissioned her into NOAA service as NOAAS Gordon Gunter (R 336) on 28 August 1998. She replaced the decommissioned NOAA fisheries research ship NOAAS Chapman (R 446).

Capabilities
Gordon Gunter is outfitted for fishing operations employing stern trawling, longlining, plankton tows, dredging, and trap fishing. She is fitted with modern navigation electronics and oceanographic winches, as well as sophisticated sensors and sampling equipment which her crew and embarked scientists use to monitor the atmospheric and oceanic environment, such as a thermosalinograph, a conductivity-temperature-depth instrument (CTD), a fluorometer, and NOAA's Scientific Computer System. Gordon Gunter has a marine mammal observation and survey station located on top of her pilot house and, as an acoustically quieted research vessel, serves as an excellent platform for the study and observation of marine mammals.

Gordon Gunter has 1,229.5 square feet (sq. ft.) (114.2 square meters) (m2) of mission-dedicated laboratory spaces, including a 360-sq.-ft. (33.4-m2) dry laboratory, a 429-sq.-ft. (39.9-m2) wet laboratory, and a 135-sq.-ft. (12.5-m2) wet laboratory.

Gordon Gunter has an ice-strengthened steel hull. She normally carries one  rigid-hulled inflatable boat (RHIB) with a 90-horsepower (67-kilowatt) motor and a maximum capacity of four persons.

In addition to her crew of 20, Gordon Gunter can accommodate up to 15 scientists.

Service history
From her home port at Pascagoula, Mississippi, Gordon Gunter operates throughout the Gulf of Mexico, Atlantic Ocean, and Caribbean Sea. A multi-use platform, she primarily serves NOAA's National Marine Fisheries Service Pascagoula Laboratory in Pascagoula, Mississippi. She conducts scientific surveys of the health and abundance of adult and larval commercial and recreational fish, the health and distribution of marine mammals, oceanographic studies, and habitat investigations.

Gordon Gunters first international project, the Windwards Humpback Cruise, took place in the Caribbean Sea. The primary objective of the cruise was to obtain scientific information on humpback whales that was used in a comprehensive assessment by the International Whaling Commission in June 2001, and to support U.S. management requirements for these endangered whales under the Marine Mammal Protection Act of 1972. Scientists aboard Gordon Gunter used both visual and acoustic techniques to locate humpback whales and other marine mammal species and located many whales by tracking their songs with sonar buoys.

Gordon Gunter supported the Sustainable Seas Expeditions – a five-year project of NOAA, the National Marine Sanctuaries Program and the National Geographic Society carried out between 1998 and 2002 – at several United States national marine sanctuaries. The project featured underwater exploration of the sanctuaries with manned submersible units.

Gordon Gunter has demonstrated mission flexibility through her ability to undergo quick reconfiguration. This mission helped fill a critical data gap in weather information that commercial fishermen, the petroleum industry, and recreational boaters rely upon heavily.

References

External links

NavSource Online: Service Ship Photo Archive: T-AGOS-18 Relentless NOAA Gordon Gunter (R-336)
noaa.gov NOAA Ship Gordon Gunter

 

Stalwart-class ocean surveillance ships
Cold War auxiliary ships of the United States
Ships built in Moss Point, Mississippi
1989 ships
Ships of the National Oceanic and Atmospheric Administration
NOAA ex-U.S. Navy Stalwart-class oceanographic research ships
Fisheries science